HD 69830 c is an exoplanet orbiting HD 69830. It is the second-closest planet in its system and has a minimum mass 12 times that of Earth. Based on theoretical modeling in the 2006 discovery paper, it is likely to be a rocky planet, not a gas giant. However, other work has found that if it had formed as a gas giant, it would have stayed that way, and it is now understood that planets this massive are rarely rocky.

References

HD 69830
Exoplanets discovered in 2006
Exoplanets detected by radial velocity
Hot Neptunes